NSW, which in full form is New South Wales, is an Australian state.

NSW may also refer to:

 National Herbarium of New South Wales, by Index Herbariorum code
 Naval Strike Wing of the UK's Royal Navy Fleet Air Arm
 Newman–Shanks–Williams prime, a class of number in mathematics
 Nintendo Switch, a games consoles' product line
 United States Naval Special Warfare Command, a military commando force

See also
 NSFW (disambiguation) (entries with for)
 NSV (disambiguation) (by transliteration)
 NWS (disambiguation)